Alexander Hermansson may refer to:
 Alexander Hermansson (ice hockey)
 Alexander Hermansson (entertainer)